(1541–1577) was a hatamoto serving Uesugi Kenshin.

Toyomori negotiated a peace treaty with the Hōjō clan in 1570, just a year after Toyomori became a hatomoto. While Kenshin was out fighting elsewhere, he entrusted the defense of Kasugayama Castle to Toyomori. Toyomori died of illness in 1577.

References 

Samurai
1541 births
1577 deaths